A container ship (also called boxship or spelled containership) is a cargo ship that carries all of its load in truck-size intermodal containers, in a technique called containerization. Container ships are a common means of commercial intermodal freight transport and now carry most seagoing non-bulk cargo.

Container ship capacity is measured in twenty-foot equivalent units (TEU). Typical loads are a mix of 20-foot (1-TEU) and 40-foot (2-TEU) ISO-standard containers, with the latter predominant.

Today, about 90% of non-bulk cargo worldwide is transported by container ships, and the largest modern container ships can carry up to 24,000 TEU (e.g., Ever Ace). Container ships now rival crude oil tankers and bulk carriers as the largest commercial seaborne vessels.

History

There are two main types of dry cargo: bulk cargo and break bulk cargo. Bulk cargoes, like grain or coal, are transported unpackaged in the hull of the ship, generally in large volume. Break-bulk cargoes, on the other hand, are transported in packages, and are generally manufactured goods. Before the advent of containerization in the 1950s, break-bulk items were loaded, lashed, unlashed and unloaded from the ship one piece at a time. Containerization has increased the efficiency of moving traditional break-bulk cargoes significantly, reducing shipping time by 84% and costs by 35%. In 2001, more than 90% of world trade in non-bulk goods was transported in ISO containers. In 2009, almost one quarter of the world's dry cargo was shipped by container, an estimated 125 million TEU or 1.19 billion tonnes worth of cargo.

The first ships designed to carry standardized load units were used in the late 18th century in England. In 1766 James Brindley designed the box boat "Starvationer" with 10 wooden containers, to transport coal from Worsley Delph to Manchester via the Bridgewater Canal. Before the Second World War, the first container ships were used to carry the baggage of the luxury passenger train from London to Paris (Southern Railway's Golden Arrow / La Flèche d'Or). These containers were loaded in London or Paris, and carried to ports of Dover or Calais on flat cars. In February 1931, the first container ship in the world was launched; the Autocarrier, owned by Southern Railway UK. It had 21 slots for containers of Southern Railway.

The earliest container ships after the Second World War were converted oil tankers, built up from surplus T2 tankers after World War II. In 1951, the first purpose-built container vessels began operating in Denmark, and between Seattle and Alaska. In 1955, McLean built his company, McLean Trucking into one of the United States' biggest freighter fleets. In 1955, he purchased the small Pan Atlantic Steamship Company from Waterman Steamship and adapted its ships to carry cargo in large uniform metal containers. On April 26, 1956, the first of these rebuilt container vessels, Ideal X, left the Port Newark in New Jersey and a new revolution in modern shipping resulted.

MV Kooringa was the world's first fully cellular purpose-built container ship and was built by Australian company, Associated Steamships Pty. Ltd. in partnership with McIlwraith, McEacharn & Co and commissioned in May 1964.

Container vessels eliminate the individual hatches, holds and dividers of the traditional general cargo vessels. The hull of a typical container ship is a huge warehouse divided into cells by vertical guide rails. These cells are designed to hold cargo in pre-packed units – containers. Shipping containers are usually made of steel, but other materials like aluminum, fiberglass or plywood are also used. They are designed to be entirely transferred to and from smaller coastal carriers, trains, trucks or semi-trailers (and so are carried by different modes of transport during one voyage, thus giving the name intermodal transport). There are several types of containers and they are categorized according to their size and functions.

Today, about 90% of non-bulk cargo worldwide is transported by container, and modern container ships can carry over 24,000 TEU. As a class, container ships now rival crude oil tankers and bulk carriers as the largest commercial vessels on the ocean.

Although containerization caused a revolution in the world of shipping, its introduction was not easy.  Ports, railway (railroad in the US) companies, and shippers were concerned about the huge costs of developing the ports and railway infrastructure needed to handle container ships, and for the movement of containers on land by rail and road. Trade unions were concerned about massive job loss among port and dock workers at ports, as containers were sure to eliminate several manual jobs of cargo handling. It took ten years of legal battles before container ships would be pressed into international service. In 1966, a container liner service from the US to the Dutch city of Rotterdam commenced. Containerization changed not only the face of shipping, but it also revolutionized world trade. A container ship can be loaded and unloaded in a few hours compared to days in a traditional cargo vessel. This, besides cutting labor costs, has greatly reduced shipping times between ports; for example, it takes a few weeks instead of months for a consignment to be delivered from India to Europe and vice versa. It has resulted in less breakage due to less handling; also, there is less danger of cargo shifting during a voyage. As containers are sealed and only opened at the destination, theft has been greatly reduced.

Containerization has lowered shipping expense and decreased shipping time, and this has in turn helped the growth of international trade. Cargo that once arrived in cartons, crates, bales, barrels or bags now comes in factory sealed containers, with no indication to the human eye of their contents, except for a product code that machines can scan and computers trace. This system of tracking has been so exact that a two-week voyage can be timed for arrival with an accuracy of under fifteen minutes. It has resulted in such revolutions as on time guaranteed delivery and just in time manufacturing. Raw materials arrive from factories in sealed containers less than an hour before they are required in manufacture, resulting in reduced inventory expense.

Exporters load merchandise in boxes that are provided by the shipping companies. They are then delivered to the docks by road, rail or a combination of both for loading onto container ships. Prior to containerization, huge gangs of men would spend hours fitting various items of cargo into different holds. Today, cranes, installed either on the pier or on the ship, are used to place containers on board the ship. When the hull has been fully loaded, additional containers are stacked on the deck.

Today's largest container ships measure  in length.  They carry loads equal to the cargo-carrying capacity of sixteen to seventeen pre-World War II freighter ships.

Architecture
There are several key points in the design of modern container ships.  The hull, similar to that of bulk carriers and general cargo ships, is built around a strong keel.  Into this frame is set one or more below-deck cargo holds, numerous tanks, and the engine room.  The holds are topped by hatch covers, onto which more containers can be stacked.  Many container ships have cargo cranes installed on them, and some have specialized systems for securing containers on board.

The hull of a modern cargo ship is a complex arrangement of steel plates and strengthening beams.  Resembling ribs, and fastened at right angles to the keel, are the ship's frames.  The ship's main deck, the metal platework that covers the top of the hull framework, is supported by beams that are attached to the tops of the frames and run the full breadth of the ship.  The beams not only support the deck, but along with the deck, frames, and transverse bulkheads, strengthen and reinforce the shell.  Another feature of recent hulls is a set of double-bottom tanks, which provide a second watertight shell that runs most of the length of a ship.  The double-bottoms generally hold liquids such as fuel oil, ballast water or fresh water.

A ship's engine room houses its main engines and auxiliary machinery such as the fresh water and sewage systems, electrical generators, fire pumps, and air conditioners.  In most new ships, the engine room is located in the aft portion.

Size categories 
Container ships are distinguished into 7 major size categories: small feeder, feeder, feedermax, Panamax, Post-Panamax, New Panamax and ultra-large. As of December 2012, there were 161 container ships in the VLCS class (Very Large Container Ships, more than 10,000 TEU), and 51 ports in the world can accommodate them.

The size of a Panamax vessel is limited by the original Panama canal's lock chambers, which can accommodate ships with a beam of up to 32.31 m, a length overall of up to 294.13 m, and a draft of up to 12.04 m. The Post-Panamax category has historically been used to describe ships with a moulded breadth over 32.31 m, however the Panama Canal expansion project has caused some changes in terminology. The New Panamax category is based on the maximum vessel-size that is able to transit a new third set of locks, which opened in June 2016. Such a vessel, called New Panamax class, is wide enough to carry 19 columns of containers, can have a total capacity of approximately 12,000 TEU and is comparable in size to a capesize bulk carrier or a Suezmax tanker.

Container ships under 3,000 TEU are generally called feeder ships or feeders.  They are small ships that typically operate between smaller container ports.  Some feeders collect their cargo from small ports, drop it off at large ports for transshipment on larger ships, and distribute containers from the large port to smaller regional ports.  This size of vessel is the most likely to carry cargo cranes on board.

Cargo cranes

A major characteristic of a container ship is whether it has cranes installed for handling its cargo.  Those that have cargo cranes are called geared and those that don't are called ungeared or gearless.  The earliest purpose-built container ships in the 1970s were all gearless.  Since then, the percentage of geared newbuilds has fluctuated widely, but has been decreasing overall, with only 7.5% of the container ship capacity in 2009 being equipped with cranes.

While geared container ships are more flexible in that they can visit ports that are not equipped with pierside container cranes, they suffer from several drawbacks.  To begin with, geared ships will cost more to purchase than a gearless ship.  Geared ships also incur greater recurring expenses, such as maintenance and fuel costs.  The United Nations Council on Trade and Development characterizes geared ships as a "niche market only appropriate for those ports where low cargo volumes do not justify investment in port cranes or where the public sector does not have the financial resources for such investment".

Instead of the rotary cranes, some geared ships have gantry cranes installed.  These cranes, specialized for container work, are able to roll forward and aft on rails.  In addition to the additional capital expense and maintenance costs, these cranes generally load and discharge containers much more slowly than their shoreside counterparts.

The introduction and improvement of shoreside container cranes have been a key to the success of the container ship.  The first crane that was specifically designed for container work was built in California's Port of Alameda in 1959.  By the 1980s, shoreside gantry cranes were capable of moving containers on a 3-minute-cycle, or up to 400 tons per hour. In March 2010, at Port Klang in Malaysia, a new world record was set when 734 container moves were made in a single hour. The record was achieved using 9 cranes to simultaneously load and unload , a ship with a capacity of 9,600 TEU.

Vessels in the 1,500–2,499 TEU range are the most likely size class to have cranes, with more than 60% of this category being geared ships.  Slightly less than a third of the very smallest ships (from 100–499 TEU) are geared, and almost no ships with a capacity of over 4,000 TEU are geared.

Cargo holds
Efficiency has always been key in the design of container ships.  While containers may be carried on conventional break-bulk ships, cargo holds for dedicated container ships are specially constructed to speed loading and unloading, and to efficiently keep containers secure while at sea.  A key aspect of container ship specialization is the design of the hatches, the openings from the main deck to the cargo holds.  The hatch openings stretch the entire breadth of the cargo holds, and are surrounded by a raised steel structure known as the hatch coaming.  On top of the hatch coamings are the hatch covers.  Until the 1950s, hatches were typically secured with wooden boards and tarpaulins held down with battens.  Today, some hatch covers can be solid metal plates that are lifted on and off the ship by cranes, while others are articulated mechanisms that are opened and closed using powerful hydraulic rams.

Another key component of dedicated container-ship design is the use of cell guides.  Cell guides are strong vertical structures constructed of metal installed into a ship's cargo holds.  These structures guide containers into well-defined rows during loading and provide some support for containers against the ship's rolling at sea.  So fundamental to container ship design are cell guides that organizations such as the United Nations Conference on Trade and Development use their presence to distinguish dedicated container ships from general break-bulk cargo ships.

A system of three dimensions is used in cargo plans to describe the position of a container aboard the ship.  The first coordinate is the bay, which starts at the front of the ship and increases aft.  The second coordinate is the row.  Rows on the starboard side are given odd numbers and those on the port side are given even numbers.  The rows nearest the centerline are given low numbers, and the numbers increase for slots further from the centerline. The third coordinate is the tier, with the first tier at the bottom of the cargo holds, the second tier on top of that, and so forth.

Container ships only take 20 foot, 40 foot, and 45 foot containers. 45 footers only fit above deck. 40 foot containers are the primary container size, making up about 90% of all container shipping and since container shipping moves 90% of the world's freight, over 80% of the world's freight moves via 40 foot containers.

Lashing systems

Numerous systems are used to secure containers aboard ships, depending on factors such as the type of ship, the type of container, and the location of the container.  Stowage inside the holds of fully cellular (FC) ships is simplest, typically using simple metal forms called container guides, locating cones, and anti-rack spacers to lock the containers together.  Above-decks, without the extra support of the cell guides, more complicated equipment is used.  Three types of systems are currently in wide use: lashing systems, locking systems, and buttress systems.  Lashing systems secure containers to the ship using devices made from wire rope, rigid rods, or chains and devices to tension the lashings, such as turnbuckles.  The effectiveness of lashings is increased by securing containers to each other, either by simple metal forms (such as stacking cones) or more complicated devices such as twist-lock stackers.  A typical twist-lock is inserted into the casting hole of one container and rotated to hold it in place, then another container is lowered on top of it.  The two containers are locked together by twisting the device's handle.  A typical twist-lock is constructed of forged steel and ductile iron and has a shear strength of 48 tonnes.

The buttress system, used on some large container ships, uses a system of large towers attached to the ship at both ends of each cargo hold.  As the ship is loaded, a rigid, removable stacking frame is added, structurally securing each tier of containers together.

Bridge
Container ships have typically had a single bridge and accommodation unit towards the rear, but to reconcile demand for larger container capacity with SOLAS visibility requirements, several new designs have been developed. , some large container ships are being developed with the bridge further forward, separate from the exhaust stack. Some smaller container ships working in European ports and rivers have liftable wheelhouses, which can be lowered to pass under low bridges.

Fleet characteristics

, container ships made up 13.3% of the world's fleet in terms of deadweight tonnage. The combined deadweight tonnage of container ships and general cargo ships, which also often carry containers, represents 21.8% of the world's fleet.

, the average age of container ships worldwide was 10.6 years, making them the youngest general vessel type, followed by bulk carriers at 16.6 years, oil tankers at 17 years, general cargo ships at 24.6 years, and others at 25.3 years.

Most of the world's carrying capacity in fully cellular container ships is in the liner service, where ships trade on scheduled routes.  As of January 2010, the top 20 liner companies controlled 67.5% of the world's fully cellular container capacity, with 2,673 vessels of an average capacity of 3,774 TEU.  The remaining 6,862 fully cellular ships have an average capacity of 709 TEU each.

The vast majority of the capacity of fully cellular container ships used in the liner trade is owned by German shipowners, with approximately 75% owned by Hamburg brokers.  It is a common practice for the large container lines to supplement their own ships with chartered-in ships, for example in 2009, 48.9% of the tonnage of the top 20 liner companies was chartered-in in this manner.

Flag states
International law requires that every merchant ship be registered in a country, called its flag state. A ship's flag state exercises regulatory control over the vessel and is required to inspect it regularly, certify the ship's equipment and crew, and issue safety and pollution prevention documents. Panama was the world's largest flag state for container ships, with 541 of the vessels in its registry. Seven other flag states had more than 100 registered container ships: Liberia (415), Germany (248), Singapore (177), Cyprus (139), the Marshall Islands (118) and the United Kingdom (104). The Panamanian, Liberian, and Marshallese flags are open registries and considered by the International Transport Workers' Federation to be flags of convenience. By way of comparison, traditional maritime nations such as the United States and Japan only had 75 and 11 registered container ships, respectively.

Vessel purchases

In recent years, oversupply of container ship capacity has caused prices for new and used ships to fall.  From 2008 to 2009, new container ship prices dropped by 19–33%, while prices for 10-year-old container ships dropped by 47–69%.  In March 2010, the average price for a geared 500-TEU container ship was $10 million, while gearless ships of 6,500 and 12,000 TEU averaged prices of $74 million and $105 million respectively.  At the same time, secondhand prices for 10-year-old geared container ships of 500-, 2,500-, and 3,500-TEU capacity averaged prices of $4 million, $15 million, and $18 million respectively.

In 2009, 11,669,000 gross tons of newly built container ships were delivered.  Over 85% of this new capacity was built in the Republic of Korea, China, and Japan, with Korea accounting for over 57% of the world's total alone.  New container ships accounted for 15% of the total new tonnage that year, behind bulk carriers at 28.9% and oil tankers at 22.6%.

Scrapping
Most ships are removed from the fleet through a process known as scrapping.  Scrapping is rare for ships under 18 years old and common for those over 40 years in age.  Ship-owners and buyers negotiate scrap prices based on factors such as the ship's empty weight (called light ton displacement or LTD) and prices in the scrap metal market.  Scrapping rates are volatile, the price per light ton displacement has swung from a high of $650 per LTD in mid-2008 to $200 per LTD in early 2009, before building to $400 per LTD in March 2010.  , over 96% of the world's scrapping activity takes place in China, India, Bangladesh, and Pakistan.

The global economic downturn of 2008–2009 resulted in more ships than usual being sold for scrap.  In 2009, 364,300 TEU worth of container ship capacity was scrapped, up from 99,900 TEU in 2008.  Container ships accounted for 22.6% of the total gross tonnage of ships scrapped that year.  Despite the surge, the capacity removed from the fleet only accounted for 3% of the world's container ship capacity.  The average age of container ships scrapped in 2009 was 27.0 years.

Largest ships

Economies of scale have dictated an upward trend in the size of container ships in order to reduce expenses. However, there are certain limitations to the size of container ships. Primarily, these are the availability of sufficiently large main engines and the availability of a sufficient number of ports and terminals prepared and equipped to handle ultra-large container ships. Furthermore, the permissible maximum ship dimensions in some of the world's main waterways could present an upper limit in terms of vessel growth. This primarily concerns the Suez Canal and the Singapore Strait.

If constructed, the container ship would become the largest seagoing vessel in the world.

Since even very large container ships are vessels with relatively low draft compared to large tankers and bulk carriers, there is still considerable room for vessel growth. Compared to today's largest container ships, Maersk Line's  Emma Mærsk-type series, a  container ship would only be moderately larger in terms of exterior dimensions. It would have an estimated deadweight of circa 220,000 tons. In 2011, Maersk announced plans to build a new "Triple E" family of container ships with a capacity of 18,000 TEU, with an emphasis on lower fuel consumption.

In the present market situation, main engines will not be as much of a limiting factor for vessel growth either. The steadily rising expense of fuel oil in the early 2010s had prompted most container lines to adapt a slower, more economical voyage speed of about 21 knots, compared to earlier top speeds of 25 or more knots. Subsequently, newly built container ships can be fitted with a smaller main engine. Maersk Line, the world's largest container shipping line, nevertheless opted for twin engines (two smaller engines working two separate propellers), when ordering a series of ten 18,000 TEU vessels from Daewoo Shipbuilding in February 2011. The ships were delivered between 2013 and 2014. In 2016, some experts believed that the current largest container ships are at the optimum size, and could not economically be larger, as port facilities would be too expensive, port handling too time consuming, the number of suitable ports too low, and insurance cost too high.

In March 2017 the first ship with an official capacity over 20,000 TEUs was christened at Samsung Heavy Industries. MOL Triumph has a capacity of 20,150 TEUs. Samsung Heavy Industries was expected to deliver several ships of over 20,000 TEUs in 2017, and has orders for at least ten vessels in that size range for OOCL and MOL.

Freight market
The act of hiring a ship to carry cargo is called chartering. Outside special bulk cargo markets, ships are hired by three types of charter agreements: the voyage charter, the time charter, and the bareboat charter.  In a voyage charter, the charterer rents the vessel from the loading port to the discharge port.  In a time charter, the vessel is hired for a set period of time, to perform voyages as the charterer directs.  In a bareboat charter, the charterer acts as the ship's operator and manager, taking on responsibilities such as providing the crew and maintaining the vessel.  The completed chartering contract is known as a charter party.

The United Nations Conference on Trade and Development [UNCTAD], tracks in its 2010 Review of Maritime Trade  two aspects of container shipping prices: The first one is a chartering price, specifically the price to time-charter a 1 TEU slot for 14 tonnes of cargo on a container ship.  The other is the freight rate; or comprehensive daily cost to deliver one-TEU worth of cargo on a given route.  As a result of the late-2000s recession, both indicators showed sharp drops during 2008–2009, and have shown signs of stabilization since 2010.

UNCTAD uses the Hamburg Shipbrokers’ Association (formally the Vereinigung Hamburger Schiffsmakler und Schiffsagenten e. V. or VHSS for short) as its main industry source for container ship freight prices.  The VHSS maintains a few indices of container ship charter prices.  The oldest, which dates back to 1998, is called the Hamburg Index.  This index considers time-charters on fully cellular container ships controlled by Hamburg brokers.  It is limited to charters of 3 months or more, and presented as the average daily cost in U.S. dollars for a one-TEU slot with a weight of 14 tonnes.  The Hamburg Index data is divided into ten categories based primarily on vessel carrying capacity.  Two additional categories exist for small vessels of under 500 TEU that carry their own cargo cranes.  In 2007, VHSS started another index, the New ConTex which tracks similar data obtained from an international group of shipbrokers.

The Hamburg Index shows some clear trends in recent chartering markets.  First, rates were generally increasing from 2000 to 2005.  From 2005 to 2008, rates slowly decreased, and in mid-2008 began a "dramatic decline" of approximately 75%, which lasted until rates stabilized in April 2009.  Rates have ranged from $2.70 to $35.40 in this period, with prices generally lower on larger ships.  The most resilient sized vessel in this time period were those from 200 to 300 TEU, a fact that the United Nations Council on Trade and Development attributes to lack of competition in this sector.  Overall, in 2010, these rates rebounded somewhat, but remained at approximately half of their 2008 values.  As of 2011, the index shows signs of recovery for container shipping, and combined with increases in global capacity, indicates a positive outlook for the sector in the near future.

UNCTAD also tracks container freight rates.  Freight rates are expressed as the total price in U.S. dollars for a shipper to transport one TEU worth of cargo along a given route.  Data is given for the three main container liner routes: U.S.-Asia, U.S.-Europe, and Europe-Asia.  Prices are typically different between the two legs of a voyage, for example the Asia-U.S. rates have been significantly higher than the return U.S.-Asia rates in recent years.  Generally, from the fourth quarter of 2008 through the third quarter of 2009, both the volume of container cargo and freight rates have dropped sharply. In 2009, the freight rates on the U.S.–Europe route were sturdiest, while the Asia-U.S. route fell the most.

Liner companies responded to their overcapacity in several ways.  For example, in early 2009, some container lines dropped their freight rates to zero on the Asia-Europe route, charging shippers only a surcharge to cover operating costs.  They decreased their overcapacity by lowering the ships' speed (a strategy called "slow steaming") and by laying up ships. Slow steaming increased the length of the Europe-Asia routes to a record high of over 40 days. Another strategy used by some companies was to manipulate the market by publishing notices of rate increases in the press, and when "a notice had been issued by one carrier, other carriers followed suit".

The Trans-Siberian Railroad (TSR) has recently become a more viable alternative to container ships on the Asia-Europe route.  This railroad can typically deliver containers in 1/3 to 1/2 of the time of a sea voyage, and in late 2009 announced a 20% reduction in its container shipping rates.  With its 2009 rate schedule, the TSR will transport a forty-foot container to Poland from Yokohama for $2,820, or from Pusan for $2,154.

Shipping industry alliances

In an effort to control costs and maximize capacity utilization on ever-larger ships, vessel sharing agreements, co-operative agreements, and slot-exchanges have become a growing feature of the maritime container shipping industry. As of March 2015, 16 of the world's largest container shipping lines had consolidated their routes and services accounting for 95 percent of container cargo volumes moving in the dominant east-west trade routes. Carriers remain operationally independent, as they are forbidden by antitrust regulators in multiple jurisdictions from colluding on freight rates or capacity. Similarities can be drawn with Airline alliances.

Container ports

Container traffic through a port is often tracked in terms of twenty foot equivalent units or TEU of throughput.  , the Port of Shanghai was the world's busiest container port, with 43,303,000 TEU handled.

That year, seven of the busiest ten container ports were in the People's Republic of China, with Shanghai in 1st place, Ningbo 3rd, Shenzhen 4th, Guangzhou 5th, Qingdao 7th, Hong Kong 8th and Tianjin 9th.

Rounding out the top ten ports were Singapore at 2nd, Busan in South Korea at 6th and Rotterdam in the Netherlands in the 10th position.

In total, the busiest twenty container ports handled 220,905,805 TEU in 2009, almost half of the world's total estimated container traffic that year of 465,597,537 TEU.

Losses and safety problems
It has been estimated that container ships lose between 2,000 and 10,000 containers at sea each year, costing $370 million. A survey for the six years 2008 through 2013 estimates average losses of individual containers overboard at 546 per year, and average total losses including catastrophic events such as vessel sinkings or groundings at 1,679 per year More recently, a survey conducted by the WSC from 2008-2019, saw an average of 1,382 shipping containers lost at sea. However, in the 3-year period from 2017-2019, that number was nearly halved, down to an average of 779 containers lost annually. Most go overboard on the open sea during storms but there are some examples of whole ships being lost with their cargo. One major shipping accident occurred in 2013 when the MOL Comfort sank with 4,293 containers onboard in the Indian Ocean. When containers are dropped, they immediately become an environmental threat – termed "marine debris". Once in the ocean, they fill with water and sink if the contents cannot hold air. Rough waters smash the container, sinking it quickly.

As container ships get larger and stacking becomes higher, the threat of containers toppling into the sea during a storm increases.  This results from a phenomenon called "parametric rolling," by which a ship can roll 30-40 degrees during rough seas creating a powerful torque on a 10-high stack of containers which can easily snap lashings and locks of the stack, resulting in losses into the sea.

On 23 March 2021, the Ever Given container ship was passing through the Suez Canal on its way to Rotterdam from China when it became stuck and blocked the canal.

See also

BBC Box
Container on barge
Environmental impact of shipping
List of largest container ships
List of world's longest ships
Ship resistance and propulsion

Notes

References

Shipboard operations

Vessel categories

Statistics

History

.
.

Safety and security

External links

Ancient and modern mariners: The romance of the high seas in an age of quantification – article in The Economist about a voyage on a 21st-century container ship

 
Maritime transport
Ship types
Intermodal containers
Port infrastructure